Megalomphalus is a genus of very small sea snails, marine gastropod mollusks in the family Vanikoridae.

Species

Species within the genus Megalomphalus include:

 Megalomphalus azoneus (Brusina, 1865)
 Megalomphalus californicus (Dall, 1903)
 Megalomphalus caro Dall, 1927
 Megalomphalus disciformis (Granata-Grillo, 1877)
 Megalomphalus lamellosus (d'Orbigny, 1842)
 Megalomphalus margaritae Rolán & Rubio, 1998
 Megalomphalus millerae (Usticke, 1959)
 Megalomphalus oxychone (Mörch, 1877)
 Megalomphalus petitianus (Tiberi, 1869)
 Megalomphalus pilsbryi (Olsson & McGinty, 1958)
 Megalomphalus ronaldi Segers, Swinnen & De Prins, 2009
 Megalomphalus schmiederi McLean, 1996
 Megalomphalus serus Rolán & Rubio, 1999
 Megalomphalus troudei (Bavay, 1908)

Synonyms:
 Megalomphalus mercatoris Adam & Knudsen, 1969 accepted as Megalomphalus disciformis (Granata-Grillo, 1877)
 Megalomphalus seguenzai Cossmann, 1918 accepted as Megalomphalus disciformis (Granata-Grillo, 1877)

References

Vanikoridae